Gravitcornutia minima is a species of moth of the family Tortricidae. It is found in Brazil.

The wingspan is 8 mm. The ground colour of the forewings is ochreous yellow. The hindwings are dark brown.

References

Moths described in 2010
Gravitcornutia
Moths of South America
Taxa named by Józef Razowski